Elizabeth Stevenson (June 13, 1919July 30, 1999) was an American author. In 1956, Stevenson became the first woman recipient of the Bancroft Prize when she won it for her book Henry Adams: A Biography. She was also awarded the Guggenheim Fellowship in 1951 and 1958.

Early life and education
Stevenson was born on 13 June 1919 in the Panama Canal Zone. She grew up in Great Falls, Montana during her childhood before moving to Atlanta, Georgia with her family. She graduated from Agnes Scott College with a Bachelor of Arts and majoring in English and history.

Career
Stevenson published her first book in 1949 titled The Crooked Corridor; A Study of Henry James. Stevenson's second book was a published biographical work on Henry Adams which won the Bancroft Prize in 1956. Her following books were a collection of Henry Adam's works in 1958 and a biography on Lafacadio Hearn in 1961. Additional books that Stevenson wrote include a timeline of the 1920s and an analysis on landscape architecture.

Outside of writing, Stevenson was a member of the War Production Board during the second World War and worked for the Atlanta Public Library in the 1950s. In 1960, she worked at Emory University as a dean's assistant until 1974 when she began teaching American studies. As the first woman faculty member at the Institute for Liberal Arts at Emory University, Stevenson remained at the university until her retirement in 1986 and given the title of emeritus.

Awards and honors
Stevenson was awarded the Guggenheim Fellowship twice in 1951 and 1958. In 1956, Stevenson was the first woman to win the Bancroft Prize with her book Henry Adams: A Biography.

Death
Stevenson died of cancer on July 30, 1999, at Peachtree Hospice in the DeKalb Medical Center, Decatur, Georgia. Her remains were cremated and a memorial service was held at Decatur on August 1, 1999.

References

External links 

 Stuart A. Rose Manuscript, Archives, and Rare Book Library, Emory University
 Elizabeth Stevenson papers, circa 1950-1999

1919 births
1999 deaths
20th-century American women writers
Bancroft Prize winners
American expatriates in Panama